Chancayoc or Chhankayuq (Quechua chhanka cliff, Ancash Quechua -yuq a suffix, "the one with a cliff", also spelled Chancayoc) is a mountain in the Andes of Peru which reaches an altitude of approximately . It is located in the Ancash Region, Bolognesi Province, Huasta District. Chancayoc lies near Pisqan Punta, southwest of the Huallanca mountain range.

References 

Mountains of Peru
Mountains of Ancash Region